Quartier Capitaine Danjou is a barracks in Castelnaudary in France.  The barracks is home to the 4th Foreign Regiment of the French Army.

References

Barracks in France
Training establishments of the French Foreign Legion